Korsmo may refer to the following people:

 Charlie Korsmo (born 1978), American former child actor turned lawyer
 Lisbeth Korsmo (1948–2017), Norwegian speed skater, cyclist, and Olympic medalist
 Arne Korsmo (1900–1968), Norwegian architect
 John Korsmo, American politician, father of Charlie